Polyrhachis dives is a wide-ranging species of ant from southern Asia and Australia, even though they are restricted to the northern territory.

Identification 
Throughout its wide distribution, P. dives is a morphologically stable species with only a few, insignificant differences between individuals, even those from far away locations. However, Southeast Asian specimens generally have a more deeply notched anterior clypeal margin and eyes that only rarely exceed the lateral cephalic outline. Most also have the tips of the propodeal spines more distinctly curved outwards, and longer petiolar spines that are somewhat curved downwards from their midlength. In contrast, the anterior clypeal margin in Australian and New Guinean specimens is only shallowly emarginated and the eyes exceed the lateral cephalic outline. The propodeal spines are only weakly curved outwards and the petiolar spines are slightly shorter and less curved.

Biology 
In Australia, P. dives are known from two isolated populations, one in the Northern Territory and the other in northern Queensland. It prefers mostly open savannah woodlands and swampy coastal plains, where it builds its silk and/or carton-based, relatively large, and usually has many nests between the branches and leaves of  shrubs.

In Japan, as it is smaller than Polyrhachis lamellidens, P. dives is also more timid. It nests in the trees,  using larval silk to stitch leaves together. Nests are highly polygynous. It is common in rural and agricultural areas of Okinawa and is well known to those who encounter it because of its strong and painful bite. In the past, it was rare in northern parts of the island and has recently extended its range northward or has become much more common. The reason for this expansion or increase in population size is unknown.

Association with other organisms 
 This species is a host for the eucharitid wasp Stilbula polyrhachicida (a parasite).
 This species is also a host for the eucharitid wasp Stilbula polyrachicida.
 This species is also a host for the eucharitid wasp Stilbuloida doddi.
 This species is  parasitized by the fungus Ophiocordyceps unilateralis.

References 

 Polyrhachis dives - AntWiki

Formicinae
Insects described in 1857